Belleville is an unincorporated community in the independent city of Suffolk, Virginia, United States. It is located at the junction of Interstate 664, U.S. Route 17, and State Route 164.

Founding 
In 1903, 40 acres of the land where Belleville now sits was purchased by William Henry Plummer, on behalf of the church to which he belonged, the Church of God and Saints of Christ. The church had a vision of founding a town on the land for his church members. However, due to financial hardship, Plummer lost the land in 1909. It was then purchased by John Eberwine in 1917 during an auction. Learning of the church's vision, Eberwine decided to continue the project.

References

Suffolk, Virginia communities
Unincorporated communities in Virginia